The 1950–51 Iowa State Cyclones men's basketball team represented Iowa State University during the 1950-51 NCAA College men's basketball season. The Cyclones were coached by Clay Sutherland, who was in his fourth season with the Cyclones. They played their home games at the Iowa State Armory in Ames, Iowa.

They finished the season 9–12, 3–9 in Big Seven play to finish in sixth place.

Roster

Schedule and results 

|-
!colspan=6 style=""|Regular Season

|-

References 

Iowa State Cyclones men's basketball seasons
Iowa State
Iowa State Cyc
Iowa State Cyc